Savitt is a surname. Notable people with the surname include:

David Savitt (1928–2018), American politician
Dick Savitt (1927–2023), American tennis player
Jan Savitt (1907–1948), American musician
Jill Savitt ( 1985–2015), American film and TV editor
Sam Savitt (1917–2000), American artist, writer, and illustrator
Scott Savitt ( 1983–2016), American journalist and editor